"Angel Kanchev" University of Ruse is a public university in the city of Ruse, Bulgaria. This was the first national higher technical school outside the Bulgarian capital.

The University of Ruse employs 31 professors, 177 docents and another 85 assistants with Doctor of Science qualification.

The tradition and the geography of the University of Ruse determine its mission and its strategic role of an educational, scientific and intellectual center of the Ruse region and northeast Bulgaria on the national and the international levels. The university has two subsidiaries structures in the cities of Silistra and Razgrad.

University of Ruse was selected by the European Commission for the TEMPUS program of 18 universities from 11 Central European countries that have achieved the best results in the transformation of higher education. It is a regular member of the European Universities Association (EUA) and of the Danube Rectors' Conference (DRC). It participates in CEEPUS, SOCRATES / ERASMUS and LEONARDO DA VINCI programs. International approval is to confirm that he built and developed as a modern university with European level of education. Due to the implementation of the credit system, the university has been conferred the ECTS label.

Faculties 
 Agrarian and Industrial Faculty 
 Faculty of Mechanical and Manufacturing Engineering
 Faculty of Electrical engineering, Electronics and Automation
 Faculty of Transport
 Faculty of Business and Management
 Faculty of Natural Sciences and Education
 Faculty of Law
 Faculty of Public Health and Health care

External links 

 
 Bulgarian-Romanian Interuniversity Europe Center

Ruse
Ruse
Ruse, Bulgaria
Buildings and structures in Ruse, Bulgaria
1945 establishments in Bulgaria